Fraxinus sogdiana is a species of flowering plant belonging to the family Oleaceae.

Its native range is Afghanistan to northwestern China and western Pakistan.

References

sogdiana
Taxa named by Alexander von Bunge